KXCI is a non-profit "community radio" radio station that serves Tucson, Arizona. KXCI broadcasts on the frequency of 91.3 MHz, and its programming includes talk shows, music shows, and call-in shows. Its call letters come from the Roman numeral for 91 (XCI).

History

In the late 1970s, the local radio landscape had an opening for a more eclectic and diverse radio station. Several people began preliminary work on the idea, and gained a construction permit in November 1982 after a frequency search and FCC filings were complete.
 
The original plan for callsigns was to run a contest to determine one, and then see if it was available. However, upon receiving a letter from the FCC regarding the need to select a callsign, a volunteer came up with the 'KXCI' idea, and that was the top choice out of five submitted to the FCC. Those calls were available and were assigned.

One year later, on November 19, 1983, at 7 p.m., the station went live on the air for the first time. It began with a stunt format, playing reggae for two days to promote a station benefit concert featuring Eek-A-Mouse. The station then ran a three-week promotion called the 'Big Broadcast of 1983,' a historical journey from the earliest music to contemporary; it included almost every genre of music, and ended on December 5 with a live concert at the studio.

Rumors of final formats were rampant. This included one that the station was going to take an urban contemporary format 24/7, causing KHYT 1330 to bill itself as 'Tucson's First Rock and Soul Station'. KHYT's promotion abruptly died once the true format was known: A 'music mix' during the day, and over 29 musical styles and genres during nights and weekends. The station still airs many genres and styles not generally found on other stations in the Tucson market.

The station was originally located at 91.7 FM. In the early 1990s, the station moved to its present 91.3 frequency to permit the station formerly known as KFMA 92.1 to raise its power and cover more of the Tucson area.

Programming
KXCI plays an eclectic mix of musical genres, spinning both independent artists along with bands/musicians on major labels.

The styles of music vary wildly, and range from (and are by no means limited to) alternative to country and Americana to blues, jazz, cumbia, rock & roll, punk rock and folk. In addition, there are many specialty shows (mostly on weeknights and weekends) which focus on particular genres. Its Monday night show, Locals Only!, broadcasting since May 1998, features Tucson's diverse and talented musicians. Locals Only! includes interviews with and live performance by the bands. KXCI is also a local carrier for Democracy Now!.

In 1995, Michael Metzger quoted the station's then board president Shirley Shade in a Tucson Weekly article that illustrates the station's diversity of musical offerings: "If you don't like something that you're hearing at this moment, just wait a minute and something different will be on," says Shirley Shade, president of the Foundation for Creative Broadcasting's board of directors. (The foundation is a non-profit corporation holding KXCI's broadcast license and overseeing the station's operation.) "It's a learning experience, it exposes you to different types of music that you might not normally listen to."

Funding
KXCI is a non-profit organization that operates under the corporation name The Foundation for Creative Broadcasting, Inc. and is designated as a cultural entity, according to the Arizona Corporation Commission website.

Per its non-profit status, and due to FCC and grant regulations, KXCI doesn't air traditional radio commercials. Instead, KXCI's disc jockeys read underwriters' spots that highlight the underwriters' businesses/events. The disc jockeys also share public service announcements that feature Tucson's local non-profits and their initiatives/events.

According to its website, "membership is the largest form of support at KXCI". Memberships range from one-time gifts in any amount to monthly sustaining members in any amount.

Local Media Collaborations
In September 2015, the City of Tucson awarded KXCI, Brink Media and Wavelab Studios a "contract to operate Tucson's new Community Media Center, officially replacing the now-defunct Access Tucson and City Channel," according to the Arizona Daily Star, which also wrote: "The partners will oversee public-access television broadcasting and local content designed to grow the economy, and provide training in media arts."

KXCI also collaborates with Tucson Weekly and Arizona Public Media's Jim Nintzel by airing the political journalist's show, Zona Politics on Sundays from 5 p.m.-5:30 p.m.

KXCI's Tucson Weekly Best of Tucson Awards
KXCI has won, or been a runner-up, in Tucson Weekly's Best of Tucson awards for over two decades. Here is a list, from KXCI.org. According to that same page (scroll to the bottom), "Previous issues of the Tucson Weekly's Best of Tucson awards are not online as of March 2016. According to this (Feb. 26, 2009) re-cap of Tucson Weekly articles, the Best of Tucson awards began in 1987."

1995: Best Radio Station for Music - "No radio station in Tucson comes close to playing the extraordinary assortment of music KXCI dispatches on the airwaves every day."

1996: Best Radio Station for Music, Runner Up - "For the first time in the history of our readers' poll, KXCI 91.3 FM slips to second place. We, however, still think it's tops."

1997: Best Radio Station for Music, Runner Up 

1998: Best Radio Station for Music, Runner Up - "Eclectic doesn't even begin to describe the range of this community radio station. You're likely to hear anything here: old-timey bluegrass, rap, blues, trance, zydeco or bootleg Dead concerts."

1999: Best Radio Station for News, Runner Up

1999: Best Radio DJ, Kidd Squidd - "Dave Squires, a.k.a. Kidd Squidd, has been a stalwart of Tucson's own KXCI-FM since moving here from Los Angeles in 1984 – and from that time on, he's been committed to the principle that ours should be one pueblo under a groove."

1999: Best Radio Station for Music - "Where else on the local airwave's will you hear Tuvan throat-singing from Mongolia, Finnish folk songs and a show of psychedelic '60s sounds?"

2000: Best Radio Station Personality, Runner Up - Hod Rod Ron "Hot Rod Ron is one of those increasingly rare-to-come-by D.J.s who does what he does for the sheer love of the music."

2000: Best Radio Station Personality, Kidd Squidd - "Once again our readers have bestowed one of their favorite accolades upon KXCI's Kidd Squidd."

2001: Best Radio Station - "If you look left on the dial to 91.3 FM, a music mix of legendary performances will greet you!" 

2002: Best Radio Station Personality, Kidd Squidd - "So, you've just discovered early British punk, but you don't know where to turn after buying Never Mind the Bollocks Here's the Sex Pistols and The Clash."

2002: Best Rock Music Station - "You had better do what you are told; you better listen to the radio! And you'd better listen to KXCI, the best station in the known universe."

2003: Best Rock Music Station, Runner Up

2003: Radio Ringmaster - "KXCI's Kidd Squidd continues to be fascinated by the river that is music."

2004: Best Rock Music Station, Runner Up

2004: Best Radio Station Personality, Kidd Squidd - "For radio enthusiasts of a certain age, the sounds emanating from the transistor used to actually be wildly enjoyable and mind-expanding, miles away from the programmed pablum that multinational conglomerates spoon-feed the masses today."

2005: Best Rock Music Station, Runner Up

2005: Best Special Evening of Radio, Twangin' Tuesday - "Tuesday nights on KXCI feature the knockout triple-bill of Shorty Stubbs' Country Fringe followed by Michael Hyatt's Route 66 and The Roze Lady's Rosie's Rhythm Room."

2006: Best Rock Music Station, Runner Up

2007: Best Rock Music Station, Runner Up

2008: Best Rock Music Station, Runner Up

2009: Best Rock Music Station, Runner Up

2010: Best Rock Music Station, Runner Up

2011: Best Radio Show for Local Music, Locals Only - "When you tune in to Locals Only on KXCI, the intimate banter among band members almost makes you feel like you're in Studio 2A with them."

2012: Best 2-1/2 Hours on KXCI, Hex Enduction Hours - "It's certainly possible the 2 1/2 hours of punk and post-punk that Julio Pena spins starting at 2:30 a.m. (!) on Wednesday might not be your thing, but it should be."

2014: Best Radio Station for News, Runner Up

2014: Best Radio Station for Music - "When they say 'real people, real radio,' they mean it."

2015: Best Radio Stations for Music - "Tucson really is lucky to have KXCI. After all, not every city can boast its own truly local community radio station."

2016:  Best Radio Stations for Music - "With staple shows like Your Morning Brew, The Home Stretch, Locals Only, Blues Review and Kidd Squid's Mystery Jukebox, eclectic musical excellence has been the hallmark of KXCI for more than 30 years."

See also
List of radio stations in Arizona
List of community radio stations in the United States

References

External links 
KXCI Website

XCI
Community radio stations in the United States
Radio stations established in 1982
1982 establishments in Arizona